The 2015–16 Croatian Football Cup was the twenty-fifth season of Croatia's football knockout competition. The defending champions were Dinamo Zagreb, having won their thirteenth title the previous year by defeating RNK Split in the final.

Calendar

Source:

Preliminary round
The draw for the preliminary round was held on 4 August 2015 at 10:00 in Zagreb. The matches were played on 26 August 2015.

* Matches played on 25 August.

First round
First round consisted of 16 single-legged matches, with 16 winners from the preliminary round joined by 16 clubs with the highest cup coefficients. The matches were played on 23 September 2015.

* Matches played on 22 September.

Second round
Second round consisted of eight single-legged ties, with 16 winners from the first round. The pairings were determined by cup coefficients. The matches were played on 28 October 2015.

* Matches played on 27 October.

Quarter-finals
Quarter-finals consisted of four single-legged ties and included eight winners from the second round. The pairings were determined by cup coefficients. The matches were played on 2 December 2015.

* Match played on 10 February.

** Match played on 8 December.

Semi-finals
Semi-final were played over two legs on 16 March and 6 April 2016. The round featured four winners from the quarter-final. The unseeded draw for semi-final pairings was held on 15 February.

First legs

Second legs

Slaven Belupo won 4–2 on aggregate.

Dinamo won 6–0 on aggregate.

Final

The final was played over one leg on 10 May 2016 at Stadion Gradski vrt, Osijek.

References

External links
Official website 

Croatian Football Cup seasons
Croatia
Croatian Cup, 2014-15